The 2020 MTV Europe Music Awards were held on 8 November 2020 at the Breakfast Television Centre in  London. The ceremony was hosted by Little Mix, making them the first group ever to host; however, only three members -- Perrie Edwards, Leigh-Anne Pinnock and Jade Thirlwall, appeared; Jesy Nelson did not participate due to health reasons. In similar fashion to its American counterpart held earlier in August, the performances were filmed at various locations across Europe and the world due to the ongoing COVID-19 pandemic. The two-hour long show was broadcast in 180 countries.

Lady Gaga was the most nominated artist with seven nominations to her name, followed by BTS and Justin Bieber with five each. BTS was the most awarded act of the ceremony, claiming awards in four of the five categories they were nominated in. Three new categories were introduced that year: Best Latin, Video for Good, and Best Virtual Live.

Performances
 
Little Mix's performance was filmed in London and incorporated "augmented reality and a contortionist". French DJ David Guetta held the premiere performance of his single "Let's Love" live from a pool at the Széchenyi Bath complex in Budapest, Hungary; British singer Raye featured in Sia's place. Both artists were "immersed in a waterfall" of laser lights. English singer Yungblud wore a women's tennis outfit for his performance and assumed the role of "Cupid", flying around the venue of London's Roundhouse and pretending to "shoot arrows at unsuspecting lovers". After reuniting with his band on the ground, in a "giant red spikey inflatable", he ripped off his white skirt to reveal Union Jack shorts.

Appearances
Becca Dudley – Pre-show co-host
Jamila Mustafa – Pre-show co-host
Anitta – presented Best Video
Bebe Rexha – presented Best Artist 
 Madison Beer – presented Best Song 
Rita Ora – presented Best Electronic
Roman Reigns – presented Best Pop
Winnie Harlow – presented Best Latin
Anne-Marie – presented Best New & Best Group
Big Sean – presented Best Hip-Hop
Lewis Hamilton – presented Video for Good
DJ Khaled – introduced Maluma & Aya Nakamura and Karol G
Dave Grohl from Foo Fighters – introduced Yungblud
Barbara Palvin – presented from Budapest
BTS - appeared through a pre-recorded message accepting Best Song and Best Group
David Guetta appeared through a pre-recorded message accepting Best Electronic
Karol G appeared through a pre-recorded message accepting Best Latin and Best Collaboration
Chris Martin from Coldplay appeared through a pre-recorded message accepting Best Rock
Hayley Williams from Paramore appeared through a pre-recorded message accepting Best Alternative
Doja Cat appeared through a pre-recorded message accepting Best New

Awards 
Voting for select categories began on 6 October on the official MTV EMA website and ended on 2 November.
Winners are listed first and highlighted in bold.

Regional awards
Best Regional Act winners were announced by Johnny Orlando via a live stream posted on the official MTV  EMA Facebook page. Winners are listed first and highlighted in bold.

References

mtv
2020
Impact of the COVID-19 pandemic on television